Yanqi Area, is an area and a town located on southern Huairou District, Beijing, China. It shares border with Liulimiao Town in its north, Huaibei and Beifang Towns in its east, Huairou and Bohai Towns in its south, and Sihai Town in its west. Its totoal population was 38,483 in 2020.

The name Yanqi corresponds to Yanqi River that passes through the area.

History 
Yanqi Town was formed from Badaohe and Fangezhuang Townships. The table below will list the historical designations of the two townships:

Administrative divisions 
As of 2021, Yanqi Area oversaw 23 subdivisions, consisted of 2 communities and 21 villages:

Gallery

See also 

 List of township-level divisions of Beijing

References 

Huairou District
Towns in Beijing
Areas of Beijing